The Investigator (1954) was a radio play written by Reuben Ship and first broadcast by the Canadian Broadcasting Corporation (CBC) on May 30 of that year. The play lampooned the actions of the U.S. House Committee on Un-American Activities (HUAC) and United States Senator Joseph McCarthy.

Plot
The Investigator concerns a Senator who is never explicitly identified as Joseph McCarthy, but who shares McCarthy's nasally whine and who uses such McCarthy-esque sayings as "Your uncooperative attitude can only cast the gravest doubts on your own loyalty." This senator dies in an airplane crash and finds himself at the gates of "Up Here", where a tribunal must decide whether he should stay Up Here or be sent "Down There". He meets Cotton Mather of the Salem Witch Trials, Tomas de Torquemada of the Spanish Inquisition and the ‘Hanging Judge’ George Jeffreys, 1st Baron Jeffreys who, despite their reputations as shrewd and conniving characters, call themselves "mere untutored novices" compared to the Senator. As it turns out, they've been looking for someone to commandeer the admission tribunal and bring to it "the latest inquisitorial techniques", and they think the Senator is the perfect man for the job.

The Senator easily gains control of the committee and soon decides that a great many persons Up Here could potentially be subversives from Down There. He calls numerous historical figures to the stand, including Thomas Jefferson, Socrates, John Milton, and Martin Luther. When they testify, they all give oddly relevant quotations of theirs, such as when Voltaire states that "liberty of thought is the life of the soul." Completely disregarding their statements regarding freedom and rights, the Senator "deports" them all to "Down There", claiming that "security is the paramount issue." Trying to call Karl Marx to the stand, the Senator accidentally calls other persons named "Karl Marx" instead of the Karl Marx; as a result, he orders that all those Up Here with the name Karl Marx be deported to Down There. The Senator's actions soon create a panic of suspicion Up Here, where everyone is now a potential subversive. For instance, Beethoven, Bach, and Wagner agree to drop Chopin from their quartet because of his "Revolutionary Étude." Chopin's replacement, a "non-controversial" cipher named Otto Schmenk, gradually replaces other famous "subversives" in literature and music, but eventually he joins them in banishment as well.

Finally, after sending dozens or hundreds of "subversives" Down There, the Senator has run out of ideas. "Can’t we jazz the hearing up with a few names?" he asks an assistant, "I don’t want them to think we’re scraping the bottom of the barrel." But Satan pays a call on the Senator, begging that his investigations cease, because the influence of those he's sent Down There are changing it too much; Karl Marx, for example, is distributing pamphlets declaring, "Workers of the Underworld, unite! You have nowhere to go but up!" ("Which Karl Marx?" asks the Senator. "How should I know! There are hundreds of them!") Satan claims the Senator is "bungling" his job, insisting there are more subtle ways to handle his committee and the deportations. But the Senator has become a demagogue, valuing his position (and absolute power) above all else. Finally, claiming that "there is no one so high as to be immune from investigation," he's found the name he's looking for: "The Chief". Now even Mather and Torquemada try to discourage him, but the Senator refuses to listen. He rises to an insane scream, crying "I AM THE CHIEF!" as "The Chief" suddenly appears before him, banishing him to Down There. However, Satan refuses him entry, so, "pursuant to Article ...", he is returned to Earth, still muttering "I am The Chief ... I am The Chief ..."

In a brief epilogue, an incredulous doctor explains to one of the Senator's allies, a Mr. Garson, that despite his being "the only survivor", found virtually unscathed at the foot of the mountain where the plane crashed, the Senator's mind has been affected, hence his strange mutterings. Declares Mr. Garson of the Senator's survival, "It was an act of God!"

History
The Investigator, which was well received by the left-wing press at the time of its airing, was considered by the right-wing faction in American politics to be anti-American propaganda. While not broadcast in the United States, within a few weeks bootleg tapes of the broadcast were in circulation in the US. Attempts to schedule it for broadcast in the US however met with great opposition from, amongst other groups, the American Legion.

Approximately 100,000 copies of a phonograph recording of the play were pressed and circulated, mostly in the US, in at least 2 printings, by an otherwise unknown record label called Discuriosities. One edition has the number 'LP 6834' on the front and a blank white back; the other edition is listed only as '6834' and has significant liner notes on the back. The LP label claims a 1954 copyright by "Radio Rarities Inc.," while the '6834' jacket says 1955. It was no secret that Radio Rarities was one of the labels run by Sidney Frey's Dauntless International which advertised in The Long Player monthly record catalog. The original dark grey labelled copies were manufactured without credit by the Custom Division of Columbia Records with undisguised matrix numbers of XTV 22476 and XTV 22477. Later pressings made into the 1970s with undersized black labels are typical Audio Rarities-type pressings. These later pressings are the ones more likely to have rear cover liner notes.

The play was denounced as communist propaganda by none other than Ed Sullivan, and the recording gained a certain status as an underground classic during one of the high points of the Great Red Scare of the McCarthy Era.

Hundreds of copies of the LP are known to exist in private record collections. Occasionally copies surface in secondhand stores and other such venues. It is available on line.

One original copy is owned by television and film writer (Twilight Zone) Jeremy Bertrand Finch who adapted it to a b&w videotape production while attending a northern California college in 1972.

It is not known how many other copies of the original pressing have survived. The British Library, London, has a copy (call number: 1LP0236812). It was issued on the British label Oriole; this pressing had red labels with a catalogue number MG 20006. The BBC has a copy of the LP; it broadcast the play in the Third Programme on 20 October 1966 (in the series 'America since the Bomb').

Broadside Records released an edition in very inferior sound quality with portions missing in 1966 (BR 451), and Smithsonian Folkways records has it available as part of their press-on-demand program, along with a full transcript for free download. Although it is not known if this edition has been improved, there are now copies of a digital transfer of the original CBC master with the "Stage 54" opening and close in circulation among collectors.

Author
Reuben Ship, who was a key writer for producer Irving Brecher's radio series The Life of Riley during the mid and late 1940s, was involved in political struggles between two unions vying for control of the burgeoning television industry in the early 1950s, and he was promptly labeled a communist in HUAC hearings. Much to the dismay of the committee, it was determined that while much of his work could be considered treasonous if written by a US citizen, Reuben Ship was Canadian. The Immigration and Naturalization Service (INS) arrested Ship in July 1953 and, after a prolonged ordeal, threw him out of the US at the Detroit/Windsor border crossing. Ship's comment upon being expelled from the "Land of Liberty" was that he "...felt liberated." It was this experience which gave him the material which he incorporated into The Investigator.

Rebroadcast
The Canadian Broadcasting Corporation has opened certain of their archives, including the recording of The Investigator. The CBC rebroadcast the play as part of its radio network's archival series Rewind on March 25, 2010. It may be downloaded by contacting the CBC at the website listed below, or it may be listened to in streaming audio by accessing the Journal for MultiMedia History, link given below.

Fallout from US broadcast
In 1962, radio station KPFK, a member station of the Pacifica Foundation and located in the Los Angeles area, broadcast the play. Although KPFK enjoyed a reputation as an underground radio station, the uproar in the community subsequent to the broadcast nearly cost the station its license.

References

External links
Canadian Broadcasting Corporation: Rewind
Archive of entire broadcast hosted by The Journal for MultiMedia History
The Investigator The Original CBC Broadcast Starring: John Drainie, Barry Morse, James Doohan (with "Heart of Darkness" radio play from 1951, Starring Lorne Greene)
The Investigator Folkways Records.

CBC Radio One programs
Canadian plays
Satirical plays
1954 plays
Canadian radio dramas
McCarthyism
Cultural depictions of Joseph McCarthy